Matteo Rivolta (born 16 November 1991) is a male Italian swimmer. He won bronze medal in 100 metres butterfly at the 2012 European Aquatics Championships.

Rivolta an athlete of the Gruppo Sportivo Fiamme Oro.

He competed at the 2012 and 2016 Olympics.  At the 2012 Summer Olympics, he finished 22nd in the 100 m butterfly and was part of the Italian team that finished in 14th in the men's 4 x 100 m medley relay.  At the 2016 Olympics, he finished in 25th in the 100 m butterfly.

At the 2012 European Championships, he was part of the Italian team that won gold in the men's 4 x 100 m medley relay, and won bronze in the men's 100 m butterfly.

At the 2015 European Short Course Championships, he was part of the Italian team that won gold in the men's 4 x 100 m medley relay, and won silver in the men's 100 m butterfly.  At the 2017 European Short Course Championship, he won the men's 100 m butterfly.

In 2021, he won the gold in the 100 m butterfly and bronze in the 50 m butterfly at the Short Course World Championship, setting a new Italian record.  As of December 2022, he also holds the Italian short course record in the 100 m butterfly. He was part of the Italian team that won gold in the men's 4 x 100 m relay in a new championship record of 3:19.76 (with Lorenzo Mora, Nicolo Martinenghi and Alessandro Miressi) and bronze in the men's 4 x 50 m medley relay (with Mora, Martinenghi and Lorenzo Zazzeri).  At the 2021 European Short Course championships he won silver in the men's 50 m butterfly and the men's 4 x 50 m medley relay.

At the 2022 Short Course World Championships, he was part of the Italian 4 x 50 m medley relay team that won the gold medal in a new world record time of 1:29.72 (with Mora, Martinenghi and Leonardo Deplano).  At that championships, he was also part of the Italian team that won bronze in the 4 x 100 m medley relay, with a new European record time (with Mora, Martinenghi and Miressi).  He was also part of the Italian 4 x 100 m medley relay team that won gold at the European Long Course Championships.

Achievements

References

External links

 
 
 
 
 Swimmer profile at Federnuoto website

1991 births
Swimmers from Milan
Living people
Italian male swimmers
Italian male butterfly swimmers
Swimmers at the 2012 Summer Olympics
Swimmers at the 2016 Summer Olympics
Olympic swimmers of Italy
European Aquatics Championships medalists in swimming
Mediterranean Games gold medalists for Italy
Mediterranean Games silver medalists for Italy
Swimmers at the 2013 Mediterranean Games
Swimmers at the 2018 Mediterranean Games
Mediterranean Games medalists in swimming
Male medley swimmers
Swimmers of Fiamme Oro
Medalists at the FINA World Swimming Championships (25 m)
20th-century Italian people
21st-century Italian people
Swimmers at the 2022 Mediterranean Games